Edgar Daniel Nixon Jr. (August 1, 1928 – February 28, 2011), better known by his stage name Nick LaTour, was an American television, film, and stage actor. LaTour was the son of African American civil rights leader Edgar Daniel Nixon and his wife, Alease Curry Nixon. On February 28, 2011, LaTour died of cancer at the age of 82.

Filmography

References

External links
 
 
 

African-American male actors
American male film actors
American male stage actors
American male television actors
Deaths from cancer in California
Male actors from Montgomery, Alabama
20th-century American male actors
21st-century American male actors
1928 births
2011 deaths
20th-century African-American people
21st-century African-American people